Armenia participated in the ninth Winter Paralympics in Turin, Italy. The country sent three representatives to the Games.

Medalists

Events

Alpine skiing
 men: Mher Avanesyan, Garush Danielyan
 women: Greta Khndzrtsyan

See also
2006 Winter Paralympics
Armenia at the 2006 Winter Olympics

References

External links
Torino 2006 Paralympic Games
International Paralympic Committee

2006
Nations at the 2006 Winter Paralympics
Winter Paralympics